The 2014 Naisten Liiga, part of the 2014 Finnish football season, was the 8th season of Naisten Liiga since its establishment in 2007. The season started on 22 March 2014 and ended on 18 October 2014. Åland United were the defending champions, having won their 2nd Finnish championship in 2013.

The season featured 10 teams. After 18 matches played, the league was divided to Championship Group of six and Relegation Group of four. The Champion, PK-35 Vantaa, qualified for the first qualifying round of the 2015–16 UEFA Women's Champions League and ONS was relegated to the Naisten Ykkönen for the 2015 season. FC Ilves was promoted.

Teams 
Merilappi United was promoted in 2013 for their first season in the Finnish women's premier division.

Preliminary stage

Championship group 
Note: Matches and points of Preliminary stage are counted

Relegation group 
Note: Matches and points of Preliminary stage are counted

Top scorers

Personal awards 
Top scorer: Sanna Saarinen, PK-35
Player of the year: Ria Öling, TPS
Young player of the year: Katriina Naumanen, Pallokissat
Referee of the year: Kirsi Heikkinen

Sources 
2014 Naisten Liiga Finnish Football Association

References

External links 
Naisten Liiga Official Homepage (in Finnish)

Kansallinen Liiga seasons
Naisten
Finland
Finland
Naisten